Optometry Today (sometimes abbreviated to OT) is a professional journal, published bi-monthly by the Association of Optometrists in the UK.

The journal's content regularly includes; news and features about scientific and technological developments in the optical sector, changes to legislation affecting optometrists and optical professionals, developments in the optical business and retail environment, new product and equipment launches and reviews.

The printed publication and website also include General Optical Council (GOC) accredited CET (Continuing Education and Training) articles with linked assessments, which UK optical professionals are required to undertake to maintain their professionally registered status with the GOC.

Subscription to the magazine is included as part of the membership of the Association of Optometrists.

History 
The publication was first launched in 1961 as The Ophthalmic Optician.

Following the move of academic institutions to adopt the term 'optometry' (in place of 'ophthalmic optics') during the late 1970s and 1980s the magazine was retitled and relaunched as Optometry Today in 1985.

Awards
In 2016, Optometry Today won the 'Best Professional Association or Royal College magazine' accolade at the Memcom Awards.

References

External links
 Optometry Today (OT) homepage

Eye care in the United Kingdom
Professional and trade magazines